M500 may refer to :
 Haskins m500, a .50 calibre round sniper rifle
 Mossberg 500, a 12-gauge shotgun
 Smith & Wesson Model 500, a .50 caliber revolver
 Palm m500 series, a 2001 handheld personal digital assistant
 a SoundBridge digital Internet radio model